In mathematics, if a topological space  is said to be complete, it may mean:
 that  has been equipped with an additional Cauchy space structure which is complete,
 e. g., that it is a complete uniform space with respect to an aforementioned uniformity,
 e. g., that it is a complete metric space with respect to an aforementioned metric;
 or that  has some topological property related to the above:
 that it is completely metrizable (often called (metrically) topologically complete),
 or that it is Čech-complete (a property coinciding with completely metrizability on the class of metrizable spaces, but including some non-metrizable spaces as well),
 or that it is completely uniformizable (also called topologically complete or Dieudonné-complete by some authors).

References